The following is a list of notable deaths in February 2021.

Entries for each day are listed alphabetically by surname. A typical entry lists information in the following sequence:
 Name, age, country of citizenship at birth, subsequent country of citizenship (if applicable), reason for notability, cause of death (if known), and reference.

February 2021

1
Soraya Abdullah, 42, Indonesian actress, COVID-19.
Edward Babiuch, 93, Polish politician, prime minister (1980) and MP (1969–1980).
Kwasi Sainti Baffoe-Bonnie, 71, Ghanaian media executive and politician.
Umberto Bruni, 106, Canadian artist and painter.
Tony Burns, 80, British boxer and trainer.
Naty Crame-Rogers, 98, Filipino actress (A Portrait of the Artist as Filipino).
Merryl Wyn Davies, 72, Welsh Muslim scholar.
Dustin Diamond, 44, American actor (Saved by the Bell, Purple People Eater, Good Morning, Miss Bliss) and comedian, heart failure caused by lung cancer.
Emil J. Freireich, 93, American oncologist, COVID-19.
Rachna Gilmore, 67, Canadian children's writer.
Jonas Gricius, 92, Lithuanian cinematographer (Hamlet, The Girl and the Echo, The Blue Bird).
Joshua Hamidu, 85, Ghanaian military officer and diplomat, chief of the defence staff (1978–1979), high commissioner to Zambia (1978) and Nigeria (2003–2005).
Peter Hindley, 76, English footballer (Nottingham Forest, Coventry City, Peterborough United), dementia.
Mark Jensen, 60, Canadian Olympic luger (1980).
Robert C. Jones, 84, American film editor (It's a Mad, Mad, Mad, Mad World, Guess Who's Coming to Dinner) and screenwriter (Coming Home), Oscar winner (1979).
Jean-Pierre Jossua, 90, French writer and theologian, COVID-19.
Ewald Kienle, 92, German inventor.
Viktor Koval, 73, Russian writer, artist and child actor (The Rumyantsev Case, An Unusual Summer), COVID-19.
Charlotte L'Écuyer, 77, Canadian politician, Quebec MNA (2003–2014).
Arlon Lindner, 85, American politician, member of the Minnesota House of Representatives (1993–2005).
Tony Momoh, 81, Nigerian politician and journalist, minister of information and culture (1986–1990).
Aleksandr Nazarchuk, 81, Russian politician, deputy (1990–1993), minister of agriculture (1994–1996), and chair of the Altai Krai Legislative Assembly (1996–2008).
P. S. Nivas, 75, Indian cinematographer and film director (Kallukkul Eeram, Enakkaga Kaathiru, Nizhal Thedum Nenjangal).
Simeon Nyachae, 88, Kenyan politician and financier, minister for finance (1998–1999).
Jack Palladino, 76, American private investigator and attorney, head injury.
Victor Pavlyuchenkov, 57, Russian stuntman and actor.
Ricky Powell, 59, American photographer, heart failure.
Serhiy Proskurnia, 63, Ukrainian stage director.
Abd al-Sattar Qasim, 72, Palestinian writer, COVID-19.
Tamara Rylova, 89, Russian speed skater, Olympic bronze medallist (1960).
Đuro Savinović, 70, Croatian Olympic water polo player (1976).
Walter Savitch, 78, American computer scientist, complications from Parkinson's disease.
Jacqueline Shumiatcher, 97, Canadian philanthropist.
Harold Stephens, 94, American author and adventurer, stroke. (death announced on this date)
John Sweeney, 86, American labor leader, president of the AFL–CIO (1995–2009).
Ryszard Szurkowski, 75, Polish road bicycle racer, Olympic silver medallist (1972, 1976).
Jamie Tarses, 56, American television executive (ABC Entertainment) and producer (Happy Endings, My Boys), complications from a stroke.
Jean-Marie Touratier, 77, French writer, author and artistic director.
Gilbert Tshiongo Tshibinkubula wa Ntumba, 78, Congolese politician, governor of Kasaï-Occidental (2006), president of Regideso.
Temur Tsiklauri, 75, Georgian pop singer and actor, COVID-19.
Cynthia Turner, 88, Maltese pianist, COVID-19.
Steven A. White, 92, American Navy admiral.

2
Naim Attallah, 89, Palestinian-born British book publisher.
Manfred Baerns, 86, German chemist.
Brutus, 19, American grizzly bear.
Roy Christopher, 85, American art director and production designer (Frasier, Murphy Brown, Wings).
Mitrofan Cioban, 79, Moldovan mathematician, member of the Academy of Sciences of Moldova.
Maureen Colquhoun, 92, British politician, MP (1974–1979).
Rennie Davis, 80, American antiwar activist (Chicago Seven), lymphoma.
Libuše Domanínská, 96, Czech operatic soprano.
David Donato, 66, American singer (White Tiger, Black Sabbath).
Peter Dunn, 91, British paediatrician.
Gordon W. Duffy, 96, American politician, member of the California State Assembly (1965–1974, 1974–1982).
Héctor Epalza Quintero, 80, Colombian Roman Catholic prelate, bishop of Buenaventura (2004–2017).
Heike Fleßner, 76, German educationalist.
Reggie Ford, 67, Guyanese Olympic boxer (1972).
Charan Gill, 84, Canadian social activist and community leader, cancer.
Walter Graf, 83, Swiss bobsledder, Olympic bronze medalist (1968).
Cecília Guimarães, 93, Portuguese actress, COVID-19.
Albert Hale, 70, American politician, president of the Navajo Nation (1995–1998), member of the Arizona House of Representatives (2011–2017) and Senate (2004–2011), COVID-19.
Pastor Heydra, 72, Venezuelan journalist, columnist and politician, deputy and MP, stroke due to complications from COVID-19.
Millie Hughes-Fulford, 75, American astronaut (STS-40) and molecular biologist, lymphoma.
Denis Huisman, 91, French academic and writer.
Grant Jackson, 78, American baseball player (Philadelphia Phillies, Baltimore Orioles, Pittsburgh Pirates), World Series champion (1979), complications from COVID-19.
Kim Bo-kyung, 44, South Korean actress (Friend, Epitaph, The Day He Arrives), liver cancer.
Jeremy Mallinson, 83, English conservationist, zookeeper (Jersey Zoo), and author.
Laura Mason, 63, British food historian, cancer.
Captain Sir Tom Moore, 100, British military officer and charity campaigner.
Fausta Morganti, 76, Sammarinese politician, captain regent (2005), COVID-19.
Zwelifile Christopher Ntuli, 67, South African politician, member of the National Assembly (2009–2014) and KwaZulu-Natal Legislature (2014–2019), COVID-19.
Vera Nunes, 92, Brazilian actress.
John O'Keeffe, 95, Irish Gaelic footballer (Millstreet).
John Henry Osmeña, 86, Filipino politician, member of the House of Representatives (1969–1971, 1995–1998) and Senate (1971–1972, 1987–1995, 1998–2004).
Harry Mark Petrakis, 97, American novelist.
Robert Pinker, 89, British sociologist.
Ilse Rieth, 92, German church musician and choir director.
David Seyfort Ruegg, 89, American-British Buddhologist, complications from COVID-19.
Abu Salman Shahjahanpuri, 81, Pakistani Islamic historian.
Frank Tandberg, 61, Norwegian author.
Jean-François Voguet, 71, French politician, senator (2001–2016), COVID-19.

3
Joann Aalfs, 97, American women's rights and LGBT rights activist.
Robert A. Altman, 74, American video game executive, co-founder and CEO of ZeniMax Media.
Ali Ansarian, 43, Iranian footballer (Persepolis, Shahrdari Tabriz, national team), COVID-19.
Jean-Pierre Bastiat, 71, French rugby union player (US Dax, national team), stroke.
Benito Boldi, 86, Italian footballer (Catania, Cesena, Biellese), complications from COVID-19.
Nilson Borges, 79, Brazilian footballer (Portuguesa-SP, Atlético Paranaense).
Klaus Bühler, 80, German politician, MP (1976–2002).
Joan Corbella, 76, Spanish psychiatrist and science communicator.
Norbert Eimer, 80, German politician, MP (1976–1994).
Gilles Fauconnier, 76, French linguist.
Anne Feeney, 69, American folk singer-songwriter and political activist, complications from COVID-19.
James Fenton, 89, Northern Irish Ulster Scots poet.
Haya Harareet, 89, Israeli actress (Ben-Hur, The Secret Partner, The Interns).
Willard Hunter, 85, American baseball player (Los Angeles Dodgers, New York Mets).
Alijan Ibragimov, 67, Uzbek-born Kazakh mining executive.
*Jamali Shadat, 78, Malaysian actor (Sun Sun Thatha, Raja Lawak Astro, Upin & Ipin) and comedian, stroke.
Abdelkader Jerbi, Tunisian film director.
Adelaide João, 99, Portuguese actress (The End of the World), COVID-19.
Art Jones, 85, Canadian ice hockey player (New Westminster Royals, Portland Buckaroos, Seattle Totems).
Ismail Kijo, 68, Malaysian politician, Selangor MLA (1995–2008), COVID-19.
Mahmoud Koushan, 88, Iranian cinematographer (Broken Spell).
Patrick Lebon, 81, Belgian film director and screenwriter.
Abdoul Aziz Mbaye, 66, Senegalese diplomat and politician, minister of culture (2012–2014), COVID-19.
Pepi Merisio, 90, Italian photographer and photojournalist.
Peter Nicholls, 84, New Zealand sculptor.
Arthur W. Nienhuis, 79, American hematologist, CEO of the St. Jude Children's Research Hospital (1993–2004).
Norbert Owona, 70, Cameroonian footballer (Union Douala, national team).
Barry Pashak, 83, Canadian politician, Alberta MLA (1986–1993).
Vera Pedrosa, 85, Brazilian diplomat and poet.
Régine Robin, 81, Canadian historian, novelist and sociologist.
Pong Sarasin, 93, Thai conglomerate executive and politician, deputy prime minister (1986–1990).
Jean-Daniel Simon, 78, French film director, screenwriter (Adélaïde) and actor (Vice and Virtue, Love at Sea).
Ashley Stephenson, 94, British horticulturalist.
M. Bala Subramanion, 103, Singaporean civil servant, postmaster-general (1967–1971).
Wayne Terwilliger, 95, American baseball player (Chicago Cubs, Washington Senators, New York Giants) and coach, complications from dementia and bladder cancer.
Tony Trabert, 90, American Hall of Fame tennis player, executive, and sports commentator, Wimbledon champion (1955).
Albán Vermes, 63, Hungarian swimmer, Olympic silver medalist (1980).
Jim Weatherly, 77, American Hall of Fame singer-songwriter ("Midnight Train to Georgia", "Neither One of Us", "You're the Best Thing That Ever Happened to Me").
Robb Webb, 82, American voice artist (60 Minutes, NFL Films, Fishing with John), complications from COVID-19.
Margreth Weivers, 94, Swedish actress (Det är långt till New York, Lotta på Bråkmakargatan, Spring of Joy).
Dahiru Yahaya, 73, Nigerian historian.

4
Firouz Bagherzadeh, 90, Iranian architect and art scholar.
William Bains-Jordan, 104, American politician, member of the Hawaii House of Representatives (1959–1962).
Paolo Bartolozzi, 63, Italian politician, MEP (1999–2014).
Frank Baude, 84, Swedish politician, leader of the Communist Party (1970−1998), heart attack.
Tom Bolton, American-Canadian astronomer. (body discovered on this date)
Boulos Nassif Borkhoche, 88, Lebanese-born Syrian Melkite Greek Catholic hierarch, archbishop of Bosra-Hauran (1983–2011).
A. David Buckingham, 91, Australian chemist.
Hüner Coşkuner, 57, Turkish singer, multiple myeloma.
Hy Cohen, 90, American baseball player (Chicago Cubs), complications from COVID-19.
Robert Dean, 93, Canadian politician, Quebec MNA (1981–1985).
Harry Donnelly, 83, Irish Gaelic footballer (Offaly).
Dianne Durham, 52, American gymnast.
Josh Evans, 48, American football player (Tennessee Titans, New York Jets), kidney cancer.
Solomon Faine, 94, New Zealand microbiologist.
Neville Fernando, 89, Sri Lankan physician and politician, MP (1977–1989) and founder of Neville Fernando Teaching Hospital, COVID-19.
Santiago García, 30, Uruguayan footballer (Nacional, River Plate-UY, Godoy Cruz), suicide by gunshot.
Ben Hannigan, 77, Irish footballer (Shelbourne, Wrexham, Dundalk).
D. N. Jha, 81, Indian historian.
Pyotr Kolodin, 90, Russian cosmonaut.
Franz Josef Kuhnle, 94, German Roman Catholic prelate, auxiliary bishop of Rottenburg-Stuttgart (1976–1990).
Mathoor Govindan Kutty, 81, Indian Kathakali artist, COVID-19.
Robert Labine, 80, Canadian politician, mayor of Gatineau (1988–1994, 1999–2001), stroke.
Cesare Leonardi, 85, Italian architect.
Charles McGee, 96, American painter.
Jaime Murrell, 71, Panamanian Christian singer and songwriter, COVID-19.
Pierre-Antoine Paulo, 76, Haitian Roman Catholic prelate, coadjutor bishop (2001–2008) and bishop (2008–2020) of Port-de-Paix.
Nolan Porter, 71, American R&B singer-songwriter.
R. T. Ramachandran, 73, Indian cricket umpire.
Ri Jae-il, 86, North Korean politician, first deputy director of the Propaganda and Agitation Department (2004–2014), lung cancer.
Pavlos Samios, Greek painter and academic.
Gil Saunders, 68, American soul singer (Harold Melvin & the Blue Notes), lung cancer and multiple sclerosis.
David Shepard, 73, American politician, member of the Tennessee House of Representatives (2001–2017), cancer and COVID-19.
Lokman Slim, 58, Lebanese publisher and political activist, shot.
Jessie Smith, 79, American R&B singer (The Ikettes).
F. Christian Thompson, 76, American entomologist.
Robert Torres, 82, Brazilian politician, deputy (1987–1995), COVID-19.
Samuel Vestey, 3rd Baron Vestey, 79, British peer and landowner, master of the horse (1999–2018).
William George Wells, 81, Australian scouting leader, chief scout commissioner of Scouts Australia (1992–1999).
Stanisław Wołodko, 70, Polish Olympic discus thrower (1976).
Vlastimil Zábranský, 84, Czech visual artist, pneumonia.

5
Ezzat El Alaili, 86, Egyptian actor (The Land, Alexandria... Why?, War in the Land of Egypt).
Robert Armstrong, 77, British racehorse trainer.
Susan Bayh, 61, American attorney, first lady of Indiana (1989–1997), glioblastoma.
Jean Bayless, 88, British actress (Crossroads), bone cancer.
Jules Bélanger, 91, Canadian academic.
Isa Bellini, 98, Italian actress (The Happy Ghost, Without Family, Love and Anarchy), presenter and singer.
Joseph Benz, 76, Swiss bobsledder and sports official, Olympic champion (1980), COVID-19.
Julio Canani, 82, Peruvian-born American racehorse breeder and trainer, COVID-19.
Ruth Dayan, 103, Israeli fashion house owner and social activist, founder of Maskit.
Dag Jostein Fjærvoll, 74, Norwegian politician, minister of defence (1997–1999) and transport (1999–2000), MP (1985–1997).
Laurent Dona Fologo, 81, Ivorian politician, president of the Economic and Social Council (2000–2011).
Imre Furmen, 87, Hungarian Olympic cyclist (1952).
Sam Gannon, 73, Australian cricketer (Western Australia, national team).
Alan Hill, 92, English cricket historian.
Abdoul Jabbar, 41, Guinean singer-songwriter.
Rob Kane, 53, American politician, member of the Connecticut Senate (2009–2017).
Robert E. Kelley, 87, American lieutenant general.
Charlie Krueger, 84, American Hall of Fame football player (San Francisco 49ers), heart and kidney failure.
Franck Louissaint, 71, Haitian painter.
Jake McCoy, 79, American Olympic ice hockey player (1964).
Douglas Miller, 71, American gospel singer.
Edward Moore, 50, Irish cricketer (national team).
Christopher Plummer, 91, Canadian actor (The Sound of Music, Beginners, All the Money in the World), Oscar winner (2012), complications from a fall.
John Pullin, 79, English rugby union player (Bristol, national team, British Lions).
Butch Reed, 66, American professional wrestler (Mid-South Wrestling, WWF) and football player (Kansas City Chiefs), heart complications from COVID-19.
Said Shah, 80, Pakistani cricket umpire.
Hershel Shanks, 90, American author and editor (Biblical Archaeology Review), founder of the Biblical Archaeology Society, COVID-19.
Shen Zhonghou, 92, Chinese engineer, member of the Chinese Academy of Engineering.
Atanas Skatov, 42, Bulgarian mountaineer, entomologist and ecologist, fall.
R. C. Soles Jr., 86, American politician, member of the North Carolina House of Representatives (1969–1977) and Senate (1977–2011).
Leon Spinks, 67, American boxer, WBA and WBC heavyweight champion (1978), Olympic champion (1976), prostate cancer.
Ernie Tate, 86, Northern Irish-born Canadian Trotskyist and anti-war activist.
Aurealius Thomas, 86, American Hall of Fame college football player (Ohio State Buckeyes).
Sir Paul Tovua, 73, Solomon Islands politician, member (since 1976) and speaker (1994–2001) of parliament.
Val Vigil, 73, American politician, member of the Colorado House of Representatives (1999–2007), stroke.
Wim Vrösch, 75, Dutch football player (Sparta Rotterdam, Fortuna Sittard) and manager (Metalurh Donetsk).
Vladimir Vysotsky, 66, Russian admiral, commander-in-chief of the navy (2007–2012).

6
Thomas Rutherford Brett, 89, American jurist, judge (1979–2003) and chief judge (1994–1996) of the U.S. District Court for Northern Oklahoma.
Syed Ata-ul-Muhaimin Bukhari, 75, Pakistani Islamic scholar, president of Majlis-e-Ahrar-ul-Islam (since 1995).
Rajie Cook, 90, American graphic designer.
Zezinho Corrêa, 69, Brazilian singer (Carrapicho), COVID-19.
Élisabeth Du Réau, 84, French historian.
Bodil Skjånes Dugstad, 93, Norwegian politician, deputy MP (1973–1977).
Zamfir Dumitrescu, 74, Romanian painter.
Nii Okwei Kinka Dowuona VI, 57, Ghanaian Ga leader, Osu Mantse (since 2010).
Ioan Dzițac, 67, Romanian mathematician and computer scientist, heart attack.
James Eayrs, 94, Canadian historian.
Harry Fielder, 80, British actor (CBTV, Doctor Who, Blake's 7).
Afonso Fioreze, 78, Brazilian Roman Catholic prelate, coadjutor bishop (2003–2004) and bishop (2004–2017) of Luziânia.
Firmanzah, 44, Indonesian academic.
Andrew Fraser, Baron Fraser of Corriegarth, 74, British financier and life peer, brain tumour.
Maria Guarnaschelli, 79, American cookbook editor and publisher, complications from heart disease.
Frank Hackinson, 93, American music publisher.
Jolán Humenyánszky, 78, Hungarian sculptor.
Burwell Jones, 87, American Olympic swimmer (1952).
Bansi Kaul, 71, Indian theatre director.
Hosea Kiplagat, 76, Kenyan politician and philanthropist, chair of the Co-operative Bank of Kenya.
Krzysztof Kowalewski, 83, Polish actor (The Deluge, What Will You Do When You Catch Me?, Teddy Bear).
Aleksandr Kozlov, 71, Russian politician, governor of Oryol Oblast (2009–2014). (death announced on this date)
Alan Lerwill, 74, British long jumper, Commonwealth Games gold medalist (1974).
Jan Willem Loot, 77, Dutch lawyer and cellist.
Abdelkhalek Louzani, 75, Moroccan footballer (Anderlecht, K.V.V. Crossing Elewijt, Olympic Charleroi), COVID-19.
Ken McCaffery, 91, Australian rugby league player (Eastern Suburbs, Queensland, national team).
Columb McKinley, 70, Scottish footballer (Airdrieonians, Dumbarton).
Osvaldo Mércuri, 76, Argentine politician, member (1985–2005) and president (1989–1997, 2001–2005) of the Buenos Aires Province Chamber of Deputies, COVID-19.
Ezra Moseley, 63, Barbadian cricketer (Glamorgan, West Indies, national team), traffic collision.
Louis Pailhas, 94, French civil servant.
René Victor Pilhes, 86, French writer and publicist.
Ossy Prestige, 56, Nigerian businessman and politician, member of the House of Representatives (since 2015).
Ken Roberts, 84, Welsh football player (Aston Villa) and manager (Chester City).
Miyuri Samarasinghe, 81, Sri Lankan actress (How to Be an Adult, Avurududa, Bheeshanaye Athuru Kathawak).
George Shultz, 100, American politician, secretary of labor (1969–1970), the treasury (1972–1974), and state (1982–1989).
Pál Simon, 91, Hungarian chemical engineer, politician, minister of heavy industry (1975–1980).
Jarnail Singh, 67, Singaporean aviation medicine pioneer.
Bruce Taylor, 77, New Zealand cricketer (Canterbury, Wellington, national team).
Claudette White, 49, American jurist, chief judge of the Quechan Tribal Indian Court (2006–2020) and for the San Manuel Band of Mission Indians (2018–2020), complications from COVID-19.
Monique Yvinou, 92, French Olympic gymnast (1948).

7
Akhtar Ali, 81, Indian tennis player and coach.
Ralph Backstrom, 83, Canadian ice hockey player (Montreal Canadiens, Los Angeles Kings), six-time Stanley Cup champion.
Lilliane Brady, 90, Australian politician, mayor of Cobar Shire (1995–1999, 2001–2004, since 2007).
Marshall Cassidy, 75, American public address announcer and sportscaster.
Cheng Rongshi, 93, Chinese physical chemist, member of the Chinese Academy of Sciences.
Cathy Cochran, 76, American jurist, judge of the Texas Court of Criminal Appeals (2001–2015).
Louise Elisabeth Coldenhoff, 85, Indonesian military officer.
Roz Cron, 95, American alto-saxophonist.
Luis Feito, 91, Spanish painter, COVID-19.
Pedro Gomez, 58, American sports journalist (The Mercury News, The Arizona Republic, ESPN).
Oscar González Loyo, 61, Mexican comic book artist (Karmatron).
Jerry Graves, 82, American basketball player (Mississippi State Bulldogs).
Lew Hill, 55, American basketball coach (UTRGV Vaqueros).
Maxine Horner, 88, American politician, member of the Oklahoma Senate (1986–2004).
Jean Josselin, 81, French Olympic boxer (1960).
Tommy Kenny, 87, Irish sports administrator, president of the Ladies' Gaelic Football Association (1977–1979).
Robert J. Lagomarsino, 94, American politician, member of the California State Senate (1961–1974) and U.S. House of Representatives (1974–1993), secretary of the House Republican Conference (1985–1989).
Leslie Laing, 95, Jamaican runner, Olympic champion (1952).
Karen Lewis, 67, American labor leader, president of the Chicago Teachers Union (2010–2014), glioblastoma.
Elliot Mazer, 79, American audio engineer and record producer.
Stefano Mazzonis di Pralafera, 72, Italian opera director (Opéra Royal de Wallonie), cancer.
J. Hillis Miller, 92, American literary critic, COVID-19.
Nicole Mosconi, 78, French philosopher and professor.
John Mullally, 90, Canadian politician, MP (1963–1965).
José Ramón Ónega, 81, Spanish journalist, writer and politician, civil governor of Province of Zamora (1979–1982) and Biscay (1982–1984), COVID-19.
Mario Osbén, 70, Chilean footballer (Colo-Colo, Cobreloa, national team), heart attack.
Clayton Pachal, 64, Canadian ice hockey player (Boston Bruins, Colorado Rockies).
Lula Pereira, 64, Brazilian football player (Santa Cruz, Ceará) and manager (Flamengo), complications from a stroke.
Giuseppe Rotunno, 97, Italian cinematographer (All That Jazz, Amarcord, Sabrina), BAFTA winner (1981).
Ricardo Silva Elizondo, 67, Mexican singer and actor (Destilando Amor, El premio mayor, Amigas y rivales), COVID-19.
Duke Simpson, 93, American baseball player (Chicago Cubs), Alzheimer's disease.
Moufida Tlatli, 73, Tunisian film director (The Silences of the Palace, The Season of Men), minister of culture (2011), COVID-19.
Jackie Vautour, 91, Canadian fisherman and activist, liver cancer and pneumonia.
Whelan Ward, 91, English footballer (Bradford City, King's Lynn).
S. Clay Wilson, 79, American cartoonist (The Checkered Demon, Zap Comix).
Ron Wright, 67, American politician, member of the U.S. House of Representatives (since 2019), COVID-19.

8
Roza Akkuchukova, 70, Russian singer, COVID-19.
Maaher At-Thuwailibi, 28, Indonesian Islamic preacher.
Davey Armstrong, 64, American Olympic boxer (1972, 1976), complications from dementia.
Malik Badri, 88, Sudanese psychologist.
Roland Berthiaume, 93, Canadian caricaturist.
Stig Brøgger, 79, Danish artist.
Servando Cano Rodríguez, 78, Mexican singer-songwriter and producer.
Jean-Claude Carrière, 89, French novelist and screenwriter (The Discreet Charm of the Bourgeoisie, The Phantom of Liberty, The Unbearable Lightness of Being).
Osvaldo Cattone, 88, Argentine theatre actor and director, prostate infection.
Cala Cimenti, 45, Italian mountaineer, avalanche.
Tony Collins, 94, English football player (Sheffield Wednesday, Watford) and manager (Rochdale).
Claude Crabb, 80, American football player (Washington Redskins, Philadelphia Eagles, Los Angeles Rams), complications from COVID-19.
Graham Day, 67, English footballer (Bristol Rovers, Portland Timbers).
Dave Egerton, 59, English rugby union player (Bath, national team), COVID-19.
Roger Englander, 94, American television director and producer.
Nola Fairbanks, 96, American actress (Paint Your Wagon).
Corrado Francia, 74, Italian singer.
Haguroyama Sojō, 86, Japanese sumo wrestler.
George Hasay, 73, American politician, member of the Pennsylvania House of Representatives (1973–2006).
Shlomo Hillel, 97, Iraqi-born Israeli politician and diplomat, speaker of the Knesset (1984–1988), minister of police (1969–1977) and internal affairs (1977).
Darshan Lal Jain, 93, Indian social activist.
Adam Kopczyński, 72, Polish Olympic ice hockey player (1972), COVID-19.
Cyril Mango, 92, British scholar.
José Maranhão, 87, Brazilian politician, deputy (1983–1994), senator (2003–2009, since 2015) and governor of Paraíba (1995–2002, 2009–2011), COVID-19.
Robert Desmond Meikle, 97, Irish botanist.
Jane Mellanby, 82, British neuroscientist, cancer.
Shūichirō Moriyama, 86, Japanese actor (Shall We Dance?, Tsuribaka Nisshi Eleven, Ōedo Sōsamō) and voice actor, pneumonia.
Harry A. McEnroe, 90, American politician, member of the New Jersey General Assembly (1980–1996).
Joan Clark Netherwood, 88–89, American photographer.
Yurnalis Ngayoh, 78, Indonesian civil servant and politician, governor of East Kalimantan (2006–2008).
GertJan Nijpels, 69, Dutch politician, mayor of Opmeer (since 2004), cardiac arrest.
Tokuyasu Nishii, 76, Japanese table tennis player.
Jean Obeid, 81, Lebanese politician, minister of foreign affairs and emigrants (2003–2004) and MP (1991–2005, since 2018), COVID-19.
Rynagh O'Grady, 66, Irish actress (Far and Away, Father Ted, Breakfast on Pluto).
Stan Palys, 90, American baseball player (Philadelphia Phillies, Cincinnati Redlegs, Tokyo Orions).
Haroon Rasheed, 58, Pakistani cricketer (Lahore, Pakistan Railways).
Phil Rollins, 87, American basketball player (Philadelphia Warriors, Cincinnati Royals, Pittsburgh Rens).
Marty Schottenheimer, 77, American football player (Buffalo Bills) and coach (Cleveland Browns, Kansas City Chiefs), complications from Alzheimer's disease.
Willie Scott, 61, American football player (Kansas City Chiefs, New England Patriots).
Anthony Sowell, 61, American serial killer.
Michał Szewczyk, 86, Polish actor (Eroica, The Two Who Stole the Moon, The Young Magician).
Tong Djoe, 94, Indonesian shipping executive.
Els Vader, 61, Dutch Olympic sprinter (1980, 1984, 1988), major duodenal papilla cancer.
Mary Wilson, 76, American Hall of Fame singer (The Supremes), hypertensive atherosclerotic cardiovascular disease.
Vera Wülfing-Leckie, 66, German-born British homeopath and translator.
Beatriz Yamamoto Cázarez, 63, Mexican politician, deputy (since 2012), COVID-19.
Seyyed Mohammad Ziaabadi, Iranian Islamic scholar, coronary heart disease.

9
Aleksandr Blinov, 66, Russian equestrian, Olympic champion (1980), hypothermia.
Éamonn Breslin, 80, Irish Gaelic footballer (Ballyfermot Gaels, Dublin County).
Roland Chassain, 74, French politician, deputy (2002–2007).
Peter C. Clapman, 84, American investment chief executive, complications from COVID-19.
Chick Corea, 79, American jazz keyboardist (Return to Forever) and songwriter ("Spain", "500 Miles High"), 23-time Grammy winner, cancer.
Kojo Dadson, 68, Ghanaian actor (Love Brewed in the African Pot, Run Baby Run, Elmina) and musician.
Michael Downing, 62, American writer and academic, cancer.
Richard Elmore, American educator (HGSE).
Valeria Gagealov, 89, Romanian actress (The Mill of Good Luck, Mihail, câine de circ), COVID-19.
Stewart Greenleaf, 81, American politician, member of the Pennsylvania House of Representatives (1977–1978) and Senate (1979–2019).
Jean Grossholtz, 91, American women's studies professor.
John Hora, 80, American cinematographer (Twilight Zone: The Movie, Gremlins, Explorers), heart failure.
Ivan Izquierdo, 83, Argentine-born Brazilian neurobiologist, pneumonia.
Rajiv Kapoor, 58, Indian actor (Ram Teri Ganga Maili, Aasmaan, Hum To Chale Pardes), heart attack.
Rosemary Karuga, 92, Kenyan visual artist.
Josef Kolmaš, 87, Czech sinologist and tibetologist.
Ebbe Kops, 91, Danish Olympic boxer (1952).
Franco Marini, 87, Italian politician, president of the senate (2006–2008), minister of labour (1991–1992) and MP (1992–2013), COVID-19.
Baldev Raj Nayar, 89, Indian-born Canadian political scientist, cancer.
Jean-Charles Perazzi, 84, French writer and journalist.
Christy Ryan, 63, Irish Gaelic footballer and hurler (St Finbarr's, Cork County).
Margaret H. Sedenquist, 94, American real estate broker and entrepreneur, COVID-19.
Yisa Sofoluwe, 53, Nigerian footballer (Abiola Babes, national team), COVID-19.
Ghédalia Tazartès, 73, French musician.
Diógenes Vergara, 50, Panamanian politician, deputy (2014–2019), shot.

10
Victor Ambrus, 85, Hungarian-born British illustrator.
Maite Axiari, 71–72, French feminist activist and cultural activist.
Gertrūda Benze, 87, German-born Lithuanian linguist and doctor.
Bruce Berger, 82, American writer, poet and pianist, lung disease.
Dick Bunt, 91, American basketball player (New York Knicks, Baltimore Bullets).
James Celebrezze, 83, American politician and jurist, member of the Ohio House of Representatives (1967–1974) and justice of the Supreme Court of Ohio (1983–1985).
Billy Conigliaro, 73, American baseball player (Boston Red Sox, Milwaukee Brewers, Oakland Athletics).
Alberto Corazón, 79, Spanish graphic designer and artist.
Katherine Creag, 47, American newscaster (WNYW, WNBC).
Edward W. Crosby, 88, American professor and academic administrator.
Dai Davies, 72, Welsh footballer (Wrexham, Everton, national team), pancreatic cancer.
Goran Daničić, 58, Serbian actor (The Meeting Point, The Robbery of the Third Reich, When I Grow Up, I'll Be a Kangaroo).
Larry Flynt, 78, American publisher (Hustler), founder of Larry Flynt Publications, heart failure.
Fanne Foxe, 84, Argentine-born American stripper.
Tamaz V. Gamkrelidze, 91, Georgian linguist and Hittitologist, president of the Georgian National Academy of Sciences (2005–2013).
Ibrahim Othman Ibrahim Idris, 60, Sudanese ex-detainee (Guantanamo Bay).
Maurizio Liverani, 92, Italian film director (Il solco di pesca), screenwriter and journalist, heart attack.
Abdul al-Majali, 86, Jordanian politician, member (1993–2010) and speaker (1998–2010) of the House of Representatives, COVID-19.
Jorge Morel, 89, Argentine classical guitarist and composer.
Ebba Nørager, 93, Danish actress.
Benjamin Orenstein, 94, Polish-born French Holocaust survivor and lecturer.
Egil Øyjord, 92, Norwegian engineer.
Pachín, 82, Spanish football player (Real Madrid, national team) and manager (Hércules).
Heinz Schuster-Šewc, 94, German Sorbian Slavic scholar.
Tim Selwood, 76, English cricketer (Middlesex, Central Districts).
Lee Sexton, 92, American banjo player.
Zainul Haque Sikder, 90, Bangladeshi businessman, founder of the Sikder Group, COVID-19.
Takao Suzuki, 94, Japanese sociolinguist.
Luc Versteylen, 93, Belgian Jesuit priest, founder of Agalev, COVID-19.
Taavo Virkhaus, 86, Estonian-American conductor and composer, COVID-19.
Mack Walker, 91, American historian, COVID-19.

11
L. Desaix Anderson, 84, American diplomat, chargé d'affaires ad interim to Vietnam (1995–1997).
George Benneh, 86, Ghanaian academic administrator and politician, minister of finance (1981) and vice-chancellor of the University of Ghana (1992–1996).
Beth Bentley, 99, American poet.
S. Prestley Blake, 106, American restaurateur, co-founder of Friendly's.
Richard Bracken, 90, American film editor (Swamp Thing, Rich Man, Poor Man, Power Rangers), kidney failure.
Rusty Brooks, 63, American professional wrestler (IWCCW, WWF, FOW).
Teresa Burga, 86, Peruvian artist.
Jacques Crickillon, 80, Belgian writer.
Bukhari Daud, 61, Indonesian academic and politician, regent of Aceh Besar (2007–2012).
Pierre-Guillaume de Roux, 57, French editor.
Charles Passmore Graham, 93, American lieutenant general.
Mary Matsuda Gruenewald, 96, American writer, pneumonia.
Wynn Hawkins, 84, American baseball player (Cleveland Indians).
Phil Horrocks-Taylor, 86, English rugby union player (Leicester Tigers, British & Irish Lions, national team).
Noboru Ishiguro, 88, Japanese Olympic racewalker (1964).
Lateef Jakande, 91, Nigerian journalist and politician, governor of Lagos State (1979–1983) and minister of works (1993–1998).
John James, 72, English footballer (Port Vale, Chester City, Tranmere Rovers).
Antonis Kalogiannis, 80, Greek singer, heart attack.
Maria Kastrisianaki, 72, Greek broadcaster, cancer. (death announced on this date)
John Kirkham, 79, English footballer (Wolverhampton Wanderers, Peterborough United, Exeter City).
Reg Lewis, 85, American bodybuilder and actor (Sextette).
Abu Sujak Mahmud, 82, Malaysian politician, Selangor MLA (1986–1999) and mayor of Shah Alam (2000–2002).
Marcelino da Mata, 80, Portuguese army officer, COVID-19.
Frank Mills, 93, British actor (Coronation Street).
Rowena Morrill, 76, American fantasy illustrator.
Javier Neves, 67, Peruvian lawyer and academic, minister of labor and promotion of employment (2004–2005), COVID-19.
Robert E. Pearlman, 81, American explorer, complications from lung cancer.
Arlene Pieper, 90, American runner.
Afzalur Rahman, 78, Indian politician, Assam MLA (1978–2011).
Rubén Alfonso Ramírez, 84, Guatemalan television presenter and politician, minister of education (2015–2016).
Leslie E. Robertson, 92, American structural engineer (World Trade Center, Shanghai World Financial Center, Bank of China Tower), blood cancer.
Jayalal Rohana, 56, Sri Lankan actor (Tikiri Suwanda, Sinhawalokanaya, Nidahase Piya DS) and screenwriter, complications from a heart attack.
Pat Russell, 97, American politician, member (1969–1987) and president (1983–1987) of the Los Angeles City Council.
Isadore Singer, 96, American mathematician (Atiyah–Singer index theorem), Abel Prize winner (2004).
Eli Soriano, 73, Filipino televangelist (Ang Dating Daan).
Philip A. Stadter, 84, American scholar of Greek historiography.
Mladen Vranković, 83, Croatian football player (HNK Rijeka, Kansas City Spurs) and manager (NK Orijent).
Michael J. Weber, 78, American research scientist, pancreatic cancer.
Joan Weldon, 90, American actress (Them!, Gunsight Ridge, Day of the Badman).

12
Mahamed Abdiqadir, Somali royal, grand sultan of Isaaq (since 1975).
Gianni Beschin, 67, Italian football referee.
Tom Bethell, 84, British-born American music journalist and author, complications from Parkinson's disease.
Ellen Cheever, 72, American interior designer and kitchen historian.
William Chervy, 83, French politician, senator (1981–1998).
Chris Conn, 83, British Grand Prix motorcycle road racer, heart attack.
Marcia Diamond, 95, Canadian actress (Deranged, Black Christmas, Spy Games).
Antonio Giménez-Rico, 82, Spanish film director (Retrato de Familia, Jarrapellejos, The Disputed Vote of Mr. Cayo) and screenwriter, COVID-19.
Milford Graves, 79, American jazz drummer (New York Art Quartet), heart failure.
Roger Griffin, 85, British astronomer.
Celso Güity, 63, Honduran footballer (Marathón, Sula, national team), cancer.
Zdeněk Hoření, 91, Czech journalist and politician, editor-in-chief of Rudé právo (1983–1989), member of the CSFR (1976–1986) and the CNR (1986–1990), pneumonia and COVID-19.
Paolo Isotta, 70, Italian musicologist and writer.
Norman Jukes, 88, English footballer (York City).
Tohami Khaled, Libyan military officer, head of the Internal Security Agency, COVID-19.
Maurizio Mattei, 78, Italian football referee, COVID-19.
Atashasta Justus Nditiye, 51, Tanzanian politician, MP (since 2015), traffic collision.
Rupert Neve, 94, British electronics engineer (Neve Electronics), pneumonia and heart failure.
Bernard Nsayi, 78, Congolese Roman Catholic prelate, bishop of Nkayi (1990–2001).
Christopher Pennock, 76, American actor (Dark Shadows).
Frederick K. C. Price, 89, American televangelist, founder of the Crenshaw Christian Center, COVID-19.
Prie GS, 56, Indonesian journalist (Suara Merdeka), cartoonist, and radio and television host, heart attack.
Paavo Pystynen, 89, Finnish Olympic long-distance runner (1964).
Helen Rae, 83, American artist.
Fujie Sakamoto, 97, Japanese nurse and midwife.
Eunice Sato, 99, American politician, mayor of Long Beach (1980–1982).
Tom Scullion, 81, Irish Gaelic footballer (Bellaghy, Derry).
John Palmer, 4th Earl of Selborne, 80, British peer and businessman, member of the House of Lords (1971–2020).
Lynn Stalmaster, 93, American casting director (Judgment at Nuremberg, Deliverance, Superman).
Russ Thyret, 76, American music executive, chairman and CEO of Warner Bros. Records (1995–2001).
Richard Tomita, 93, American Olympic weightlifter (1948).
Pavel Vácha, 80, Czech photographer.
Carlo Wagner, 67, Luxembourgian politician, deputy (1994–1999, 2004–2013) and minister of health (1999–2004).

13
Xabier Agirre, 69, Spanish politician, member of the Basque Parliament (2004–2005, 2005–2007, 2012–2016).
Simonetta Bernardi, 81, Italian historian.
Inger Bjørnbakken, 87, Norwegian alpine skier, world champion (1958), fire.
Pat Bond, 94, American BDSM activist, founder of The Eulenspiegel Society, congestive heart failure.
Louis Clark, 73, English musical arranger (Electric Light Orchestra, Hooked on Classics), conductor, and keyboardist.
Peter G. Davis, 84, American music critic.
Sydney Devine, 81, Scottish singer.
Marco Dimitri, 58, Italian Satanist, heart attack.
Jonathan Edewor, 78, Nigerian Anglican prelate, bishop of Oleh (1999–2012).
Bud Estes, 74, American politician, member of the Kansas House of Representatives (2014–2017) and Senate (since 2017), mayor of Bucklin (1976–1990).
Urs Jaeggi, 89, Swiss sociologist, painter, and author.
Franz Jalics, 93, Hungarian Roman Catholic Jesuit priest and theologian, COVID-19.
Bolesław Kwiatkowski, 78, Polish Olympic basketball player (1968).
George Mandel, 101, American Beat writer.
Helen Meier, 91, Swiss writer.
Dave Nalle, 61, American political writer, game author and font designer, COVID-19.
Masashige Narusawa, 96, Japanese film director and screenwriter (The Woman in the Rumor, Street of Shame).
Olle Nygren, 91, Swedish speedway rider, COVID-19.
Alberto Oliart, 92, Spanish politician, minister of defence (1981–1982) and chairman of RTVE (2009–2011), COVID-19.
Frank Orr, 84, Canadian Hall of Fame sports journalist (Toronto Star).
Andon Qesari, 78, Albanian actor and stage director.
James Ridgeway, 84, American investigative journalist (The Village Voice, The New Republic, The Wall Street Journal).
Enrique Rodríguez Galindo, 82, Spanish anti-ETA Civil Guard and convicted state terrorist (GAL), COVID-19.
Emanuel Rubin, 92, American pathologist.
Sinyo Harry Sarundajang, 76, Indonesian politician, mayor of Bitung (1991–2000), governor of North Sulawesi (2005–2015) and ambassador to the Philippines (since 2018).
Raymond Specht, 96, Australian plant ecologist.
Kadir Topbaş, 76, Turkish politician, mayor of Beyoğlu (1999–2004) and Istanbul (2004–2017), complications from COVID-19.
Ansley Truitt, 70, American basketball player (Dallas Chaparrals, Crispa Redmanizers), COVID-19.
Max Vernon, 85, British police officer and hostage negotiator (Balcombe Street siege, Iranian Embassy siege), pneumonia complicated by COVID-19.
Yury Vlasov, 85, Russian writer and weightlifter, Olympic champion (1960).
Françoise Winnik, 68, French-born Canadian chemist and researcher.
Alan Woan, 90, English footballer (Northampton Town, Crystal Palace, Aldershot).

14
Jody Alderson, 85, American swimmer, Olympic bronze medalist (1952).
Blanca Álvarez González, 63, Spanish journalist, writer and poet.
Mourid Barghouti, 76, Palestinian poet and writer (I Saw Ramallah).
Catherine Belsey, 80, British literary critic and academic, stroke.
William M. Boothby, 102, American mathematician.
Jacqueline Donny, 93, French beauty pageant contestant, Miss France (1948), Miss Europe (1948).
Hywel Francis, 74, Welsh politician, MP (2001–2015) and chair of the Joint Committee on Human Rights (2010–2015).
Robert R. Glauber, 81, American academic, pancreatic cancer.
Ari Gold, 47, American singer-songwriter, leukemia.
Ulla Johansen, 93, Estonian-German ethnologist.
Serhii Kamyshev, 64, Ukrainian diplomat, ambassador to China (2004–2009, since 2019).
Finn Knutsen, 88, Norwegian politician, MP (1985–1989).
Berta Berkovich Kohút, 99, Czechoslovakian-born American Holocaust survivor, complications from COVID-19.
Nevenka Koprivšek, 61, Slovenian actress and theatrical producer.
Christopher Lee, 79, British writer (This Sceptred Isle) and historian, COVID-19.
W. J. M. Lokubandara, 79, Sri Lankan politician, member (1977–2010) and speaker (2004–2010) of the Parliament and governor of Sabaragamuwa Province (2010–2015), COVID-19.
Sir William Macpherson, 94, Scottish jurist, High Court judge (1983–1996), hereditary chief of Clan Macpherson (since 1969).
Audrey Meaney, 89, English-Australian archaeologist and historian.
Carlos Menem, 90, Argentine politician, president (1989–1999), senator (since 2005) and governor of La Rioja Province (1973–1976, 1983–1989), complications from urinary tract infection.
Michael Menaker, 86, Austrian-born American chronobiologist.
William Meninger, 88, American Trappist monk.
Doug Mountjoy, 78, Welsh snooker player.
Nguyễn Tài Thu, 89, Vietnamese physician.
Ion Mihai Pacepa, 92, Romanian intelligence officer and defector, COVID-19.
Iain Pattinson, 67, British screenwriter, leukemia.
Jean Roulland, 89, French sculptor.
Syarifudin Tippe, 67, Indonesian military officer, rector of the Defence University (2011–2012).
Hylke Tromp, 85, Dutch polemologist.
Pilar Unzalu, 63, Spanish politician, member of the Basque Parliament (2000–2004) and deputy (2008–2009).
Lorenzo Washington, 34, American football player (Alabama Crimson Tide, New England Patriots).
Zachary Wohlman, 32, American boxer.

15
Werner Aderhold, 83, German musicologist.
Kōjirō Akagi, 87, Japanese painter.
Andreas Apostolopoulos, 69, Greek-Canadian real estate developer.
Tito Arecchi, 87, Italian physicist, fall.
Steuart Bedford, 81, English conductor and pianist.
Florence Birdwell, 96, American educator, musician and singer.
Doris Bunte, 87, American politician, member of the Massachusetts House of Representatives (1973–1984), cancer.
Dame Fiona Caldicott, 80, British psychiatrist and academic administrator, principal of Somerville College, Oxford (1996–2010).
Alberto Canapino, 57, Argentine racing car engineer, COVID-19.
Sandro Dori, 82, Italian actor (Be Sick... It's Free, Il Prof. Dott. Guido Tersilli, primario della clinica Villa Celeste, convenzionata con le mutue) and voice actor.
Jimmy Evans, 81, American politician, attorney general of Alabama (1991–1995), complications from pneumonia and heart attack.
Lucien Gourong, 77, French writer, singer, and storyteller, COVID-19.
Lucía Guilmáin, 83, Mexican actress (Las fuerzas vivas, Length of War, Darker Than Night), COVID-19.
Andréa Guiot, 93, French operatic soprano, COVID-19.
George Hart, 75, British Egyptologist.
Gerard Hemsworth, 75, British artist.
Richard H. Holm, 87, American chemist.
Vincent Jackson, 38, American football player (San Diego Chargers, Tampa Bay Buccaneers).
Nechan Karakéhéyan, 88, Greek-born Armenian Catholic hierarch, ordinary of Eastern Europe (2005–2010) and Greece (1991–2000), eparch of Ishafan (2001–2003).
Golnoush Khaleghi, 80, Iranian music researcher, composer, and arranger.
Derek Khan, 63, Trinidadian-American fashion stylist, COVID-19.
Muhammed Seif Khatib, 70, Tanzanian politician, MP (1995–2015).
Raymond Lévesque, 92, Canadian singer-songwriter, poet, and actor (Bernie and the Gang), COVID-19.
Leopoldo Luque, 71, Argentine footballer (River Plate, Unión, national team), world champion (1978), COVID-19.
Kenny McDevitt, 91, English footballer (Tranmere Rovers).
Gideon Meir, 74, Israeli diplomat, ambassador to Italy and Malta (2006–2011), cancer.
Zdzisław Najder, 90, Polish literary critic, historian and political activist.
John Oyioka, Kenyan politician, MP (2017–2021).
Johnny Pacheco, 85, Dominican-American musician (Fania All-Stars) and label executive (Fania Records), complications from pneumonia.
José Pedrozo, 38, Paraguayan footballer (Antofagasta, San Marcos de Arica), traffic collision.
Gregorio Américo Pérez Valdés, 79, Cuban baseball player, prostate cancer.
Eva Maria Pracht, 83, German-Canadian equestrian, Olympic bronze medalist (1988), COVID-19.
Jalaluddin Rakhmat, 71, Indonesian politician, MP (2014–2019), COVID-19.
Lilia Quindoza Santiago, 72, Filipino writer and academic.
P. B. Sawant, 90, Indian jurist, judge of the Supreme Court (1989–1995), cardiac arrest.
Rowsch Shaways, 74, Iraqi politician, prime minister of Kurdistan Region (1996–1999) and vice president (2004–2005).
Arne Sorenson, 62, American hotel executive, president and CEO of Marriott International (since 2012), pancreatic cancer.
Andreas Teuber, 78, American academic and actor (Doctor Faustus).
Ștefan Tudor, 77, Romanian rower, Olympic bronze medallist (1972).
István Turu, 58, Hungarian Olympic boxer (1988), COVID-19.
Betty Willingale, 93, British television producer and script editor.
Rhea Woltman, 92, American pilot (Mercury 13).

16
José Álvarez de Paz, 85, Spanish politician, deputy (1979–1987) and MEP (1986–1995) and civil governor of Pontevedra province (1994–1996).
Irit Amiel, 89, Polish writer and poet.
Jason Benjamin, 50, Australian artist.
James Bishop, 93, American painter.
Carman, 65, American Christian singer, complications from hiatal hernia surgery.
Otakar Černý, 77, Czech sports journalist and television presenter.
Doğan Cüceloğlu, 83, Turkish psychologist, aortic dissection.
Trevor Dannatt, 101, British architect (Royal Festival Hall).
Don Dietrich, 59, Canadian ice hockey player (Chicago Blackhawks, New Jersey Devils), complications from cancer and Parkinson's disease.
Niki Erlenmeyer-Kimling, 88, American psychiatric geneticist.
Wayne Giardino, 77, Canadian football player (Ottawa Rough Riders).
Werner Grobholz, 78, German violinist.
Rama Jois, 89, Indian politician and jurist, governor of Jharkhand (2002–2003) and Bihar (2003–2004), chief justice of the Punjab and Haryana High Court (1992), heart attack.
John Florian Kordek, 82, American diplomat.
Lew Krausse Jr., 77, American baseball player (Milwaukee Brewers, Boston Red Sox, St. Louis Cardinals), cancer.
Agnes Lange, 91, German politician, member of the Bürgerschaft of Bremen (1984–1991).
Bernard Lown, 99, Lithuanian-born American inventor and cardiologist, developer of the defibrillator, pneumonia and heart failure.
Ángel Mangual, 73, Puerto Rican baseball player (Oakland Athletics, Pittsburgh Pirates), World Series champion (1972, 1973, 1974).
Joan Margarit, 82, Spanish poet, Miguel de Cervantes Prize winner (2019), cancer.
Maïté Mathieu, 92, French political activist and feminist.
Jessica McClintock, 90, American fashion designer.
Gustavo Noboa, 83, Ecuadorian politician, president (2000–2003) and vice president (1998–2000), governor of Guayas Province (1983–1984), heart attack.
Wayne Nunnely, 68, American college football coach (UNLV Rebels, San Diego Chargers, Denver Broncos) and player (UNLV).
Atsutada Otaka, 76, Japanese composer.
Saw Swee Hock, 89, Singaporean mathematician and philanthropist.
Jan Sokol, 84, Czech philosopher and politician, MP (1990–1992) and minister of education, youth and sports (1998), Charter 77 signatory.
Claudio Sorrentino, 75, Italian voice actor and dubbing director, COVID-19.
Soul Jah Love, 31, Zimbabwean reggae singer.
Si Spencer, 59, British comic book writer (Books of Magick: Life During Wartime, The Vinyl Underground).
Yusriansyah Syarkawi, 70, Indonesian politician, regent of Paser (1999–2004, since 2016).
*Tonton David, 53, French reggae singer, stroke.
Sleiman Traboulsi, Lebanese politician and magistrate, minister of electrical and water resources (1998–2000).
Michel Vuillermet, 70, French film director.

17
Oscar Albarado, 72, American boxer, WBA/WBC super welterweight champion (1974–1975).
Özcan Arkoç, 81, Turkish footballer (Hamburger SV, Beşiktaş, national team).
Françoise Cactus, 56, French musician (Stereo Total) and author, breast cancer.
Jacinto Cayco, 96, Filipino Olympic swimmer (1948).
Carlos Chacón Galindo, 86, Peruvian politician, provincial mayor of Cusco Province (1967–1969, 1987–1989).
Raffaele Cutolo, 79, Italian mobster, founder of the Nuova Camorra Organizzata, pneumonia.
Darius Elias, 48, Canadian politician, Yukon MLA (2006–2016).
Marc Ellington, 75, American-born Scottish folk-rock singer-songwriter, musician and conservationist.
Edwin A. Fleishman, 93, American psychologist.
Francis B. Francois, 87, American engineer.
Jan Geersing, 80, Dutch politician, mayor of Ferwerderadiel (1988–2001).
Seif Sharif Hamad, 77, Tanzanian politician, vice president (2010–2016, since 2020) and chief minister of Zanzibar (1984–1988), COVID-19.
Frances Harris, 71, Australian-born British historian.
Mary Holt, 96, British politician, MP (1970–1974).
Ali Hossain, 80, Bangladeshi composer.
Henry B. Heller, 79, American politician, member of the Maryland House of Delegates (1987–2011).
Iraj Kaboli, 82, Iranian writer, linguist and translator.
Sir Eddie Kulukundis, 88, British shipping magnate and philanthropist.
Rush Limbaugh, 70, American Hall of Fame radio host (The Rush Limbaugh Show), author, and political commentator, complications from lung cancer.
Andrea Lo Vecchio, 78, Italian composer, lyricist and record producer, COVID-19.
Francisco Luzón, 73, Spanish banker, complications from amyotrophic lateral sclerosis.
John Manning, 80, English footballer (Tranmere Rovers, Barnsley).
Christine McHorse, 72, American ceramics artist, COVID-19.
Omar Moreno Palacios, 82, Argentine folk singer-songwriter, guitarist and gaucho, encephalitis.
Joseph Pastor Neelankavil, 90, Indian Syro-Malabar Catholic hierarch, eparch of Sagar (1987–2006).
John K. Rafferty, 82, American politician, member of the New Jersey General Assembly (1986–1988), mayor of Hamilton Township (1976–1999).
Vasco do Rego, 96, Indian Jesuit priest.
Mike Renshaw, 72, English-born American soccer player (Rhyl, Dallas Tornado, United States national team).
Sir Derek Roberts, 88, British engineer and academic administrator, provost of University College London.
René Roemersma, 62, Dutch activist.
Donald P. Ryder, 94, American architect.
Gianluigi Saccaro, 82, Italian fencer, Olympic champion (1960).
Tetsurō Sagawa, 84, Japanese actor, complications from amyotrophic lateral sclerosis.
Luna Shamsuddoha, 67, Bangladeshi software and banking executive, chairman of Janata Bank (since 2018).
Satish Sharma, 73, Indian politician, MP (1991–1998, 1998–2004, 2010–2016), minister of petroleum and natural gas (1993–1996).
Naomi Shelton, 78, American musician.
Martha Stewart, 98, American actress (Doll Face, Johnny Comes Flying Home, Are You with It?) and singer.
Gene Summers, 82, American rockabilly singer, complications from an injury sustained at home.
Humphrey Taylor, 82, English Anglican clergyman, bishop of Selby (1991–2003).
U-Roy, 78, Jamaican reggae singer.
Martí Vergés, 86, Spanish footballer (España Industrial, Barcelona, national team).
Mufwankolo Wa Lesa, 85, Congolese humorist and theatre director.
Murray Weideman, 85, Australian football player (Collingwood, Victoria) and coach.
Nancy Worden, 66, American artist and metalsmith, complications from amyotrophic lateral sclerosis.
Jyrki Yrttiaho, 68, Finnish politician, MP (2007–2015).
Avetis Zenyan, 85, Russian cinematographer.

18
Amīr Aṣlān Afshār, 101, Iranian diplomat, ambassador to West Germany (1973–1977) and the U.S. (1969–1972), COVID-19.
Luis Balagué, 76, Spanish road bicycle racer.
Balanchine, 30, American Thoroughbred racehorse, Epsom Oaks and Irish Derby winner (1994).
Vittore Bocchetta, 102, Italian sculptor, painter and academic.
Alan Curtis, 90, British actor (Carry On Henry, Doctor Who, Four Dimensions of Greta).
Abdullahi Dikko, 60, Nigerian government official.
Mark Van Drumpt, Dutch sports physiotherapist (Garryowen, Limerick), cancer.
Graeme English, 56, British Olympic freestyle wrestler (1988).
Wolf-Peter Funk, 77, German-born Canadian religious historian.
Ketty Fusco, 94, Swiss-Italian actress, director and writer.
Hans-Werner Grosse, 98, German glider pilot.
Sergo Karapetyan, 72, Armenian politician, minister of agriculture (2010–2016), COVID-19.
Mushahid Ullah Khan, 68, Pakistani politician, senator (since 2009) and minister of climate change (2015, 2017–2018).
Isaac Thomas Kottukapally, 72, Indian film score composer (Swaham, Thaayi Saheba, Adaminte Makan Abu).
Frank Lupo, 66, American television writer and producer (The A-Team, Wiseguy, Walker, Texas Ranger).
Jan Mans, 80, Dutch politician, mayor of Meerssen (1982–1989), Kerkrade (1989–1994), and Enschede (1994–2005).
Farouk Muhammad, 71, Indonesian police officer and politician, senator (2009–2019).
Andrey Myagkov, 82, Russian actor (The Irony of Fate, Office Romance, A Cruel Romance), People's Artist of the RSFSR (1986), heart attack.
Leslie Osterman, 73, American politician, member of the Kansas House of Representatives (2011–2019).
Juan Pizarro, 84, Puerto Rican baseball player (Milwaukee Braves, Chicago White Sox), cancer.
Prince Markie Dee, 52, American rapper (The Fat Boys), heart failure.
Bill Ramseyer, 84, American football player, coach and administrator.
John Roach, 87, American football player (Green Bay Packers).
Yehoshua Sagi, 87, Israeli intelligence officer and politician, director of the Military Intelligence Directorate (1979–1983) and member of the Knesset (1988–1992).
Kristofer Schipper, 86, Dutch sinologist.
John Spencer, 74, Australian rugby league player (Balmain, New South Wales).
Guido Stagnaro, 96, Italian film director (I cinque del quinto piano) and screenwriter (In Love, Every Pleasure Has Its Pain), co-creator of Topo Gigio, COVID-19.
Chris Vincent, 86, British motorcycle sidecar road racer.
Jack Vivian, 79, Canadian ice hockey coach (Bowling Green Falcons, Cleveland Crusaders).
Donald C. Wintersheimer, 89, American jurist, justice of the Kentucky Supreme Court (1983–2007).
Leonid Yachmenyov, 83, Russian basketball coach (WBC Dynamo Novosibirsk, women's national team).

19
Faisal Abdulaziz, 53, Bahraini footballer (Muharraq, national team).
Luigi Albertelli, 86, Italian songwriter ("Zingara") and television author, complications from a fall.
Ebba Andersson, 85, Swedish footballer (Öxabäcks, national team).
Đorđe Balašević, 67, Serbian singer-songwriter (Rani Mraz), COVID-19.
Michel Bernard, 88, French politician, deputy (1986–1988).
Philippe Chatel, 72, French singer-songwriter, heart attack.
Bobby Lee Cook, 94, American lawyer (Wayne Williams, Bobby Hoppe, Jake Butcher).
Kenneth Davey, 88, English academic.
Arturo Di Modica, 80, Italian-American sculptor (Charging Bull), cancer.
Lawrence Otis Graham, 59, American attorney and author.
Rupert Hambro, 77, British banker, businessman and philanthropist.
Jocelyn Hardy, 75, Canadian ice hockey player (California Golden Seals, Cleveland Crusaders) and coach (Shawinigan Cataractes), complications from a heart attack.
Joseph Kesenge Wandangakongu, 92, Congolese Roman Catholic prelate, bishop of Molegbe (1968–1997).
Ludvík Liška, 91, Czech Olympic middle-distance runner (1952).
Liu Fusheng, 89, Chinese politician, delegate to the National People's Congress (1975–1978, 1988–1998).
Calixto Malcom, 73–74, Panamanian jurist and Olympic basketball player (1968).
Fousiya Mampatta, 52, Indian football player and manager, cancer.
Leonard Martino, 95, American politician, member of the Pennsylvania House of Representatives (1969–1974).
Adolf Mathis, 83, Swiss Olympic alpine skier (1960, 1964).
Ioannis Mazarakis-Ainian, 98, Greek army officer and historian.
Mya Thwe Thwe Khine, 20, Burmese protester (2021–2022 Myanmar protests), complications from gunshot wounds.
Tayseer Najjar, 46, Jordanian journalist, heart disease.
Clotilde Niragira, 52–53, Burundian politician and lawyer, minister of justice (2005–2007), stroke.
Dianna Ortiz, 62, American Roman Catholic nun and anti-torture advocate, cancer.
Jerold Ottley, 86, American music director and choral conductor, complications from COVID-19.
Les Pridham, 83, Australian footballer (Essendon).
Naomi Rosenblum, 96, American photography historian, heart failure.
Silvio Sérafin, 82, French footballer (FC Nancy, Angers SCO, Angoulême-Soyaux Charente).
LaVannes Squires, 90, American basketball player (Kansas Jayhawks).
Bill Wright, 84, American golfer.

20
Chris Ajilo, 91, Nigerian highlife musician.
I Gede Ardhika, 76, Indonesian politician, minister of culture and tourism (2000–2004).
Serpil Barlas, 64, Turkish singer.
Mauro Bellugi, 71, Italian footballer (Inter Milan, Bologna, national team), complications from COVID-19.
Richard Boyd, 78, American philosopher.
Joe Burke, 81, Irish accordionist.
Gerald Cardinale, 86, American politician, member of the New Jersey General Assembly (1980–1982) and Senate (since 1982).
Henri Courtine, 90, French judoka.
Chris Craft, 81, British racing driver.
David de Keyser, 93, British actor (On Her Majesty's Secret Service, Diamonds Are Forever, Doctor Who).
Fredrik Stefan Eaton, 82, Canadian businessman and philanthropist.
Charlotte Fielden, 88, Canadian novelist.
Bob Hindmarch, 90, Canadian academic and ice hockey coach (UBC Thunderbirds, national team).
Dean Ho, 88, American professional wrestler (WWWF, PNW, NWA Hawaii), complications from chronic traumatic encephalopathy.
Halja Klaar, 90, Estonian film artist.
Alcide M. Lanoue, 86, American military officer, surgeon general of the United States Army (1992–1996).
Koyya Hassan Manik, 67, Maldivian actor (Hinithun Velaashey Kalaa, Ihsaas, Bos) and producer, COVID-19.
Nurul Haque Miah, 76, Bangladeshi chemist.
Jean-Yves Moyart, 53, French criminal lawyer and blogger.
Yemane Niguse, Ethiopian politician and Tigray activist, assassinated.
Rosamond Asiamah Nkansah, 91, Ghanaian police officer, first woman recruited into the Ghanaian force.
Maurice Pelé, 92, French road racing cyclist.
ATM Shamsuzzaman, 79, Bangladeshi actor (Surja Dighal Bari, Hajar Bachhor Dhore) and playwright.
Richard Shephard, 71, British composer and headmaster.
Yuri Shvachkin, 90, Russian chemist.
Gene Taylor, 68, American pianist (Canned Heat, The Blasters, The Fabulous Thunderbirds).
Nicola Tempesta, 85, Italian Olympic judoka (1964, 1972).
Wai Yan Tun, 16, Burmese protester, shot.
Douglas Turner Ward, 90, American playwright and actor (The River Niger), co-founder of the Negro Ensemble Company.
Stan Williams, 84, American baseball player (Los Angeles Dodgers, Cleveland Indians) and coach (Cincinnati Reds).

21
Mireya Arboleda, 92, Colombian classical pianist.
Rod Arrants, 76, American actor (Search for Tomorrow, Days of Our Lives, Rent).
Christopher Cardozo, 72, American art collector, photographer and publisher, stroke.
Arthur Cook, 92, American sports shooter, Olympic champion (1948).
Kevin Dann, 62, Australian rugby league player (Penrith Panthers, New South Wales).
Isabelle Dhordain, 62, French journalist.
Patricia Drennan, 87, British cartoonist and illustrator, lung cancer.
André Dufraisse, 94, French racing cyclist, world cyclo-cross champion (1954–1958).
Dick Geary, 75, British historian.
Charlie Gorin, 93, American baseball player (Milwaukee Braves).
Katie Hurley, 99, American politician, member of the Alaska House of Representatives (1985–1987).
Judy Irola, 77, American cinematographer (Northern Lights, Working Girls), complications from COVID-19.
Giovanni Knapp, 77, Italian racing cyclist, complications from a fall.
Mike Law, 78, Canadian football player (Edmonton Eskimos).
Shane Lewis, 47, Australian Olympic swimmer (1992).
Jan Lityński, 75, Polish politician and journalist, deputy (1989–2001).
Hélène Martin, 92, French singer and songwriter.
Bernard Njonga, 65, Cameroonian activist and politician.
Radamés Salazar, 46, Mexican politician, senator (since 2018), COVID-19.
Hal Santiago, 80, Filipino Illustrator and writer.
Zlatko Saračević, 59, Croatian handball player and coach, Olympic champion (1996).
Glynne Thomas, 85, British ice hockey player (Streatham Redskins, Wembley Lions, national team).
Abdülkadir Topkaç, 67, Turkish astronomer, cancer.
Geoffrey Ursell, 77, Canadian writer, complications from Parkinson's disease.
Marc Waelkens, 72, Belgian archaeologist.
Doug Wilkerson, 73, American football player (Houston Oilers, San Diego Chargers).
Alexander Zhdanov, 70, Russian actor (The Wind of Travel, Pugachev, Russian Symphony), People's Artist of the RSFSR (1995).

22
Luca Attanasio, 43, Italian diplomat, ambassador to the Democratic Republic of the Congo (since 2017), shot.
Sir John Bailey, 92, British lawyer and public servant, HM procurator general and treasury solicitor (1984–1988).
Seif Bamporiki, Rwandan politician, shot.
Paul Barber, 85, English bishop.
Peter J. Barnes III, 64, American politician, member of the New Jersey General Assembly (2007–2014) and Senate (2014–2016).
Jack Bolton, 79, Scottish footballer (Ipswich Town, Raith Rovers, Dumbarton).
Georges Bonnet, 101, French writer and poet.
Paolo Castaldi, 90, Italian composer and essayist.
Raymond Cauchetier, 101, French photographer, COVID-19.
Hipólito Chaiña, 67, Peruvian doctor and politician, member of Congress (since 2020), COVID-19.
Jean Cleymans, 76, Belgian physicist.
Mohanbhai Sanjibhai Delkar, 58, Indian politician, MP (1989–2009, since 2019).
Xato de Museros, 88–89, Spanish Valencian pilotari.
Aleksander Doba, 74, Polish kayaker and adventurer.
Lawrence Ferlinghetti, 101, American poet (A Coney Island of the Mind) and co-founder of City Lights Bookstore, interstitial lung disease.
Maria Ghezzi, 93, Italian designer (La Settimana Enigmistica) and painter.
Yekaterina Gradova, 74, Russian actress (Seventeen Moments of Spring, The Meeting Place Cannot Be Changed), stroke.
Laurindo Guizzardi, 86, Brazilian Roman Catholic prelate, bishop of Bagé (1982–2001) and Foz do Iguaçu (2001–2010).
Martin Heffernan, 76, Irish Gaelic footballer (Tullamore, Offaly).
Pairoj Jaisingha, 77, Thai actor (Tears of the Black Tiger).
Miguel Arsenio Lara Sosa, 68, Mexican politician, member of the Congress of Yucatán (1998–2001), heart attack.
Lamberto Leonardi, 81, Italian football player (Roma, Juventus) and manager (Salernitana).
Jean-François Leroux-Dhuys, 86, French writer and historian.
Liu Zhongshan, 92, Chinese army officer and politician, political commissioner of National University of Defense Technology (1990–1994).
Richard Marriott, 90, English banker and public administrator, lord lieutenant of the East Riding of Yorkshire (1996–2005).
Olle Martinsson, 76, Swedish Olympic ski jumper (1964).
Anis al-Naqqash, 70, Lebanese political activist and guerrilla fighter, COVID-19.
Benno Ndulu, 71, Tanzanian banker, governor of the Bank of Tanzania (2008–2018).
Jack Quaid, 88, Irish hurler (Feohanagh-Castlemahon, Limerick).
Peter Rattray, 62, New Zealand cricketer (Canterbury).
Consuelo Rodríguez Píriz, 60, Spanish politician, member of the Assembly of Extremadura (since 2011), COVID-19.
Yalchin Rzazadeh, 74, Azerbaijani pop singer.
Giancarlo Santi, 81, Italian film director (The Grand Duel, Quando c'era lui... caro lei!).
Daviz Simango, 57, Mozambican politician, mayor of Beira (since 2003) and leader of the Democratic Movement of Mozambique (since 2009), complications from COVID-19 and diabetes.
Anant Tare, 67, Indian politician, Maharashtra MLC (2000–2006).
John Vattanky, 89, Indian Jesuit theologian.
Philippe Venet, 91, French fashion designer and couturier.
Thomas Vinciguerra, 57, American journalist (The New York Times, The Wall Street Journal, The New Yorker) and writer.
Jack Whyte, 80, Scottish-Canadian novelist (The Skystone, The Singing Sword, The Saxon Shore), cancer.
Dick Witcher, 76, American football player (San Francisco 49ers), liver cancer.

23
Vojkan Borisavljević, 73, Serbian composer (Hell River, Barking at the Stars).
Franco Cassano, 77, Italian sociologist and politician, deputy (2013–2018).
Harry Clark, 88, English footballer (Darlington, Hartlepool United).
Jerzy Dietl, 93, Polish economist and politician, senator (1989–1991).
Abdul Qadir Djaelani, 82, Indonesian Islamic preacher and politician, MP (2000–2004).
Jean Grenet, 81, French politician, deputy (1993–1997, 2002–2012) and mayor of Bayonne (1995–2014).
Fausto Gresini, 60, Italian Grand Prix motorcycle racer, world champion (1985, 1987) and founder of Gresini Racing, complications from COVID-19.
Peter Harris, 85, English television director (The Muppet Show, Spitting Image, Bullseye), COVID-19.
Rafael Gurrea Induráin, 80, Spanish politician, member (1979–2007) and president (2003–2007) of the Parliament of Navarre.
Herbin Hoyos, 53, Colombian journalist and broadcaster (Cadena SER), COVID-19.
Gary Inness, 71, Canadian ice hockey player (Washington Capitals, Pittsburgh Penguins, Philadelphia Flyers), dementia.
Othman Kechrid, 100, Tunisian politician, minister of the interior (1979–1980).
Rahul Khullar, 68, Indian civil servant, chairman of the Telecom Regulatory Authority of India (2012–2015).
Tormod Knutsen, 89, Norwegian Nordic combined skier, Olympic champion (1964).
Syed Abul Maksud, 74, Bangladeshi journalist (Prothom Alo) and writer.
Margaret Maron, 82, American mystery writer, complications from a stroke.
Julio Márquez de Prado, 72, Spanish judge, president of the High Court of Justice of Extremadura (2004–2019).
Yves Martin, 91, Canadian sociologist.
Juan Masnik, 77, Uruguayan football player (Nacional, national team) and manager (Atlético Marte).
Art Michalik, 91, American football player (San Francisco 49ers, Pittsburgh Steelers) and professional wrestler.
Gord Miller, 96, Canadian politician, Ontario MPP (1975–1990).
Wolfango Montanari, 89, Italian Olympic sprinter (1952).
Sergiu Natra, 96, Romanian-born Israeli composer.
Pastoral Pursuits, 20, British Thoroughbred racehorse, July Cup winner (2005).
Luz María Puente, 97, Mexican pianist.
Néstor Mario Rapanelli, 91, Argentine economist, businessman (Bunge & Born) and politician, minister of economy (1989).
Henry D. Sahakian, 84, Iranian-born American businessman, founder of Uni-Mart.
Geoffrey Scott, 79, American actor (Dynasty, Dark Shadows, Hulk), Parkinson's disease.
Sealy Hill, 17, Canadian Hall of Fame Thoroughbred racehorse.
James Sedin, 90, American ice hockey player, Olympic silver medalist (1952).
František Šedivý, 93, Czech resistance fighter and political prisoner.
Willy Ta Bi, 21, Ivorian footballer (national team), liver cancer.
Heinz Hermann Thiele, 79, German transportation and parts executive (Knorr-Bremse, Vossloh) and investor (Lufthansa).
Frits Veerman, 76, Dutch nuclear espionage whistleblower.
Ahmed Zaki Yamani, 90, Saudi Arabian politician, minister of petroleum and mineral resources (1962–1986).

24
Wolfgang Boettcher, 86, German classical cellist.
Antonio Catricalà, 69, Italian civil servant and lawyer, secretary of the Council of Ministers (2011–2013), suicide by gunshot.
Bulantrisna Djelantik, 73, Dutch-born Indonesian Balinese dancer and physician, pancreatic cancer.
Tom Foley, 74, Irish racehorse trainer (Danoli), cancer.
Gary Halpin, 55, Irish rugby union player (London Irish, Leinster, national team).
Philippe Jaccottet, 95, Swiss poet and translator.
Val Keckin, 83, American football player (San Diego Chargers).
Ayong Maliksi, 82, Filipino politician, member of the House of Representatives (1998–2001, 2010–2013), governor of Cavite (2001–2010).
Enda McDonagh, 90, Irish Roman Catholic priest.
Atsushi Miyagi, 89, Japanese tennis player, U.S. National doubles champion (1955).
Sylvia Murphy, 89, Canadian singer, COVID-19.
Alan Robert Murray, 66, American sound editor (Letters from Iwo Jima, American Sniper, Joker), Oscar winner (2007, 2015).
Dal Orlov, 86, Russian film critic, screenwriter (Leader, Hard to Be a God) and writer.
Peter Ostroushko, 67, American violinist and mandolinist.
Ronald Pickup, 80, English actor (Darkest Hour, The Best Exotic Marigold Hotel, The Mission).
Joseph Ponthus, 42, French writer, cancer.
Sardool Sikander, 60, Indian folk and pop singer, COVID-19.
N'Singa Udjuu, 86, Congolese politician, first state commissioner of Zaire (1981–1982).

25
Art Anderson, 84, American football player (Chicago Bears, Pittsburgh Steelers).
Mashari Al-Ballam, 49, Kuwaiti actor, COVID-19.
Peter Beadle, 87, New Zealand artist.
Albert Bers, 89, Belgian footballer (Sint-Truidense V.V.) and football coach (Belgium women's national team).
Ivy Bottini, 94, American artist and civil rights activist.
Arkady Davidowitz, 90, Russian writer and aphorist, cardiac arrest.
Lorys Davies, 84, Welsh archdeacon.
Craig Dixon, 94, American Olympic hurdler, bronze medalist (1948).
Joseph Duffey, 88, American academic, anti-war activist and government official.
Klaus Emmerich, 92, Austrian journalist, COVID-19.
Hugh Fate, 91, American politician, member of the Alaska House of Representatives (2001–2005).
Simone Gad, 73, Belgian-born American artist and actress (Speed).
John Geddert, 63, American gymnastics coach, suicide by gunshot.
Manfred Gerstenfeld, 84, Austrian-born Israeli author and economist.
Andrei Gherman, 79, Moldovan physician, minister of health (2001–2005).
Peter Gotti, 81, American mobster (Gambino crime family).
Bede Vincent Heather, 92, Australian Roman Catholic prelate, auxiliary bishop of Sydney (1979–1986) and bishop of Parramatta (1986–1997).
Zdenek Herman, 86, Czech physical chemist.
Darrius Johnson, 48, American football player (Denver Broncos, Kansas City Chiefs), heart failure.
Jim Johnson, 92, Australian Hall of Fame jockey.
Rafi Levi, 83, Israeli footballer (Maccabi Tel Aviv, Sydney Hakoah, national team).
John Mallard, 94, British medical researcher.
Leroy J. Manor, 100, American Air Force lieutenant general, joint commander of Operation Ivory Coast.
Muriel Marland-Militello, 77, French politician, deputy (2002–2012).
Hannu Mikkola, 78, Finnish rally driver, world rally champion (1983), cancer.
Archibald Mogwe, 99, Botswanan politician and diplomat, minister of foreign affairs (1974–1984).
Erik Myers, 40, American comedian, actor and writer, traffic collision.
Vishnunarayanan Namboothiri, 81, Indian poet.
Andrei Palii, 80, Moldovan agronomist, genetics specialist, member of the Academy of Sciences of Moldova.
Antoine Pfeiffer, 80, French reformist pastor, president of the Protestant Reformed Church of Alsace and Lorraine (1988–2000).
Bob Pixel, 44, Ghanaian photographer, complications from COVID-19.
Yves Ramousse, 93, French Roman Catholic prelate, apostolic vicar of Phnom Penh (1962–1976, 1992–2001) and Battambang (1992–2000), COVID-19.
Hussein F. Sabbour, 85, Egyptian civil engineer and architect.
George Sanford, 78, British political scientist.
Juan Francisco Sarasti Jaramillo, 82, Colombian Roman Catholic prelate, archbishop of Cali (2002–2011), complications from COVID-19.
Bahjat Suleiman, 72, Syrian general and diplomat, COVID-19.
Masako Sugaya, 83, Japanese voice actress (Bannertail: The Story of Gray Squirrel, Astro Boy, Ohayō! Spank).
János Szabó, 83, Hungarian politician, MP (1990–1994) and  minister of agriculture (1993–1994).
Maurice Tanguay, 87, Canadian businessman and sporting director.
Ton Thie, 76, Dutch footballer (ADO Den Haag, San Francisco Golden Gate Gales).
Vladimir Zuykov, 86, Russian film animator (Film, Film, Film), artist and illustrator, COVID-19.

26
Tarhata Alonto-Lucman, 94, Filipino politician, governor of Lanao del Sur (1971–1975).
Ladislava Bakanic, 96, American Olympic gymnast (1948).
David Manyok Barac Atem, South Sudanese military officer, COVID-19.
Patricia Bartley, 103, British codebreaker.
Jacques Beckers, 87, Dutch-born American astronomer.
*Tarek El-Bishry, 87, Egyptian politician and judge, head of the constitutional review committee (2011), complications from COVID-19.
Rosmarie Bleuer, 94, Swiss Olympic alpine skier (1948).
Martin Brauer, 49, German actor.
Bill C. Davis, 69, American playwright (Mass Appeal) and actor, complications from COVID-19.
William de Gelsey, 99, Hungarian-British banker and economist.
Johnny DeFazio, 80, American professional wrestler (WWWF), cancer.
Noel Elliott, 74, Irish rugby union player (Dolphin, Munster, national team).
Mo Forte, 73, American football coach (Denver Broncos).
Ronald Gillespie, 96, Canadian chemistry professor, VSEPR theory model co-developer.
Irving Grundman, 92, Canadian ice hockey general manager (Montreal Canadiens).
José Guccione, 69, Argentine politician and physician, deputy (2011–2015), COVID-19.
Mitsusuke Harada, 92, Japanese-English martial artist.
Eva Herlitz, 68, German businesswoman and writer.
Bob James, 68, American rock singer-songwriter (Montrose), stomach ulcer complications. (death announced on this date)
Aleksandr Klepikov, 70, Russian rower, Olympic champion (1976).
Philip Ray Martinez, 63, American jurist, judge of the U.S. District Court for Western Texas (since 2002), heart attack.
Des McAleenan, 53, Irish-American soccer player (Connecticut Wolves, Albany Alleycats) and coach (New York Red Bulls).
David McCabe, 80, British fashion photographer.
John Mendenhall, 72, American football player (New York Giants).
Horacio Moráles, 77, Argentine Olympic footballer (1964).
Al Naples, 94, American baseball player (St. Louis Browns).
Miloš Novák, 68, Czech ice hockey player, 1971 European U19 bronze medalist.
D. Pandian, 88, Indian politician, MP (1989–1996), sepsis.
Jean Perrottet, 95, French architect.
Joel A. Pisano, 71, American jurist, judge of the U.S. District Court for New Jersey (2000–2015).
Àngel Pla, 91, Spanish-born Andorran wood carver, COVID-19.
Alfredo Quintana, 32, Cuban-born Portuguese handballer (FC Porto, national team), cardiac arrest.
Janice Sarich, 62, Canadian politician, Alberta MLA (2008–2015), cancer.
Anura Senanayake, Sri Lankan police officer and singer, cancer.
Stan Shaw, 94, British cutler.
György Snell, 71, Hungarian Roman Catholic prelate, auxiliary bishop of Esztergom–Budapest (since 2014), COVID-19.
Sir Michael Somare, 84, Papua New Guinean politician, chief minister (1973–1975) and prime minister (1975–1980, 1982–1985, 2002–2010, 2011), pancreatic cancer.
Ferdinand Vega, 84, Puerto Rican Olympic archer (1972).
Gabriel Zavala, 76, Mexican-born American mariachi musician and teacher, COVID-19.

27
Nozar Azadi, 82, Iranian comedian and actor.
Alexander Barinev, 68, Russian ice hockey player (Kristall Saratov, HC Spartak Moscow, VEU Feldkirch).
Serge Bec, 88, French poet.
Vilmos Benczik, 75, Hungarian Esperantist.
Juan Antonio Bolea, 90, Spanish politician, president of the Government of Aragon (1978–1981) and deputy (1977–1979), heart attack.
Mike Bradner, 83, American politician, member (1967–1977) and speaker (1975–1977) of the Alaska House of Representatives, complications from COVID-19.
Mike Burns, 84, British-born Irish newscaster (RTÉ News at One, This Week, World Report).
Rachel Cathoud, 74, Swiss actress (The Porter from Maxim's, The Wonderful Day), COVID-19.
José Manuel Cortizas, 58, Spanish sports journalist and voice actor, COVID-19.
Dante Crippa, 83, Italian footballer (Brescia, Juventus, S.P.A.L.), complications from COVID-19.
Edgar Gillock, 92, American politician, member of the Tennessee Senate (1969–1983).
Linus Nirmal Gomes, 99, Indian Roman Catholic prelate, bishop of Baruipur (1977–1995).
Alvils Gulbis, 84, Latvian basketball player (Rīgas ASK, VEF Rīga).
Patrick Hoguet, 80, French politician, deputy (1993–1997, 2002–2003).
Kenneth Lamar Holland, 86, American politician and lawyer, member of the U.S. House of Representatives (1975–1983).
Ferdinand van Ingen, 87, Dutch Germanist.
Marta Martin Carrera-Ruiz, 80, Cuban-American television personality, (El Gordo y la Flaca), COVID-19.
Russ Martin, 60, American radio broadcaster (KEGL, KLLI-FM).
Pascal Monkam, 90, Cameroonian businessman.
Angel Moraes, 55, American DJ and producer.
N. K. Sukumaran Nair, 78, Indian environmentalist.
Ng Man-tat, 69, Hong Kong actor (My Heart Is That Eternal Rose, A Moment of Romance, Shaolin Soccer), liver cancer.
Louis Nix, 29, American football player (Notre Dame Fighting Irish, Houston Texans), drowned.
Éva Olsavszky, 91, Hungarian actress.
Didier Poissant, 97, French Olympic sailor (1956).
Peter Raedts, 72, Dutch historian, complications from a fall.
Bill Sanders, 90, American political cartoonist.
DeWitt Searles, 100, American major general.
Robert Sommer, 91, American environmental psychologist.
Mariano Valdés Chávarri, 74, Spanish cardiologist and academic, COVID-19.
Erica Watson, 48, American actress (Precious, Chi-Raq), comedian and writer, complications from COVID-19.
Michael Wieck, 92, German violinist and author.

28
Sabah Abdul-Jalil, 69, Iraqi football player (national team) and manager (Al-Naft, Al-Quwa Al-Jawiya), COVID-19.
Artidjo Alkostar, 72, Indonesian judge, member of the Supreme Court (2000–2018).
Taslim Azis, 56, Indonesian pesilat and politician, MP (2019).
Milan Bandić, 65, Croatian politician, mayor of Zagreb (2000–2002, since 2005), heart attack.
Michael J. Barron, 87, American jurist, judge of the Milwaukee County Circuit Court (1972–1988).
Aqel Biltaji, 80, Jordanian politician, mayor of Amman (2013–2017), complications from COVID-19.
Johnny Briggs, 85, English actor (Coronation Street, Man About the House, Carry On England).
Larry Crabb, 77, American Christian counselor and author.
Irv Cross, 81, American football player (Philadelphia Eagles, Los Angeles Rams) and sportscaster (The NFL Today).
Zbyszek Darzynkiewicz, 84, Polish-American cell biologist.
Sunil de Silva, 80, Sri Lankan politician, attorney general (1988–1992).
Richard Faith, 94, American composer.
Arnfinn Graue, 94, Norwegian nuclear physicist.
Tom Green, 72, American Mormon polygamist, COVID-19.
Roger Kibbe, 81, American serial killer, strangled.
William Liller, 93, American astronomer.
Ty Lund, 82, Canadian politician, Alberta MLA (1989–2012).
Anna Majani, 85, Italian entrepreneur, COVID-19.
Mamoru Morimoto, 81, Japanese Olympic runner (1964).
Ian North, 68, American punk and new wave musician (Milk 'N' Cookies), heart attack.
Jorge Oñate, 71, Colombian vallenato singer, complications from COVID-19.
Mary Oshlag, 79, American bridge player, complications from Alzheimer's disease.
Mahinur Qasim, 91, Kazakh-born Chinese politician, delegate to the National People's Congress (1959–1975) and member of the Standing Committee (1988–1993).
Glenn Roeder, 65, English football player (Queens Park Rangers) and manager (West Ham United, Newcastle United), brain cancer.
Andrew Sardanis, 89, Cypriot-Zambian journalist and businessman.
Karl Schiewerling, 69, German politician, MP (2005–2017).
Yousuf Shaaban, 89, Egyptian actor (There is a Man in our House, Mother of the Bride, My Wife, the Director General), COVID-19.
Syd Slocomb, 90, Australian footballer (St Kilda).

References

2021-02
 02